Thorrur may refer to:

 Thorrur, Ranga Reddy, a village in Telangana, India
 Thorrur, Warangal, a village in Telangana, India